Balacra is a genus of moths in the family Erebidae.

Species
 Balacra affinis Rothschild, 1910
 Balacra alberici (Dufrane, 1945)
 Balacra aurivilliusi Kiriakoff, 1957
 Balacra basilewskyi Kiriakoff, 1953
 Balacra batesi Druce, 1910
 Balacra belga Kiriakoff, 1954
 Balacra brunnea Grünberg, 1907
 Balacra caeruleifascia Walker, 1856
 Balacra compsa Jordan, 1904
 Balacra conradti Oberthür, 1911
 Balacra daphaena Hampson, 1898
 Balacra diaphana Kiriakoff, 1957
 Balacra distincta Kiriakoff, 1953
 Balacra ehrmanni Holland, 1893
 Balacra elegans Aurivillius, 1892
 Balacra flava Przybylowicz, 2013
 Balacra flavimacula Walker, 1856
 Balacra fontainei Kiriakoff, 1953
 Balacra furva Hampson, 1911
 Balacra germana Rothschild, 1912
 Balacra guillemei (Oberthür, 1911)
 Balacra haemalea Holland, 1893
 Balacra herona Druce, 1887
 Balacra humphreyi Rothschild, 1912
 Balacra inflammata Hampson, 1914
 Balacra intermedia Rothschild, 1912
 Balacra jaensis Bethune-Baker, 1927
 Balacra magna Hulstaert, 1923
 Balacra micromacula Strand, 1920
 Balacra monotonia (Strand, 1912)
 Balacra nigripennis Aurivillius, 1904
 Balacra ochracea Walker, 1869
 Balacra preussi Aurivillius, 1904
 Balacra pulchra Aurivillius, 1892
 Balacra rattrayi Rothschild, 1910
 Balacra rubricincta Holland, 1893
 Balacra rubrostriata (Aurivillius, 1892)
 Balacra similis Hulstaert, 1923
 Balacra simplex Aurivillius, 1925
 Balacra simplicior Kiriakoff, 1957
 Balacra stigmatica Grünberg, 1907
 Balacra tamsi Kiriakoff, 1957
 Balacra testacea Aurivillius, 1881
 Balacra umbra Druce, 1910
 Balacra vitreata Rothschild, 1910
 Balacra vitreigutta Hulstaert, 1923

References

Natural History Museum Lepidoptera generic names catalog

 
Syntomini
Moth genera